Conor McCarthy is an Irish hurler who plays club hurling for Nenagh Éire Óg and at inter-county level with the Tipperary senior hurling team.

Career
On 25 February 2023, he made his league debut for Tipperary in the third round of the 2023 National Hurling League, starting at right corner-back against Dublin, as Tipperary won by 2–23 to 0–24.

References

Tipperary inter-county hurlers
Living people
Nenagh Éire Óg hurlers
Year of birth missing (living people)